Artizone is an online food delivery service connecting customers in selected U.S. cities with local artisans through one website.

History 
Artizone was founded in 2009 as a spin-off of the local Israeli branch of Dassault Systemes (DS). At its inception, Artizone focused on maintaining the ENOVIA SmarTeam V5 products owned by DS. In 2010, the company launched its website, creating the Artizone online specialty food shopping community with 22 local artisans in Dallas. In Jan 2012, Artizone expanded to Chicago.

Founders:
Alex Zeltcer,
Lior Lavy,
Shmuel Zichel,
Sagi Briteman,
and Yehudit Buchnik.

Locations 
Artizone.com operates in the Dallas area and in the Chicago area.
 Dallas area:
Dallas, Addison, Allen, Carrollton, Coppell, Flower Mound, Frisco, Irving, McKinney, Plano, Richardson.
 Chicago area:
DuPage, Lake, Cook.

Vendors

Dallas, Texas

Source:

Chicago, Illinois

See also
 FreshDirect
 Peapod
 AmazonFresh

References

External links 
 Corporate Website

Online marketplaces of the United States
Companies based in Dallas
American companies established in 2009
Retail companies established in 2009
Transport companies established in 2009
Internet properties established in 2009
Retail companies disestablished in 2016
Transport companies disestablished in 2016
Internet properties disestablished in 2016
Online food ordering